An EMD GP28 is a 4-axle diesel-electric locomotive built by General Motors Electro-Motive Division between March 1964 and November 1965.  Power was provided by an EMD 567D1 16-cylinder engine which generated . This locomotive was basically a non-turbocharged version of the EMD GP35.

16 examples of this locomotive model were built for American railroads, 10 were built for Mexican railroads, and five were built for use in Peru.

Original buyers

References 

 
 
 
 
 

GP28
B-B locomotives
Diesel-electric locomotives of the United States
Railway locomotives introduced in 1964
Standard gauge locomotives of the United States
Standard gauge locomotives of Mexico
Standard gauge locomotives of Peru
Diesel-electric locomotives of Mexico
Diesel-electric locomotives of Peru